Newton station is a train station in Newton, Kansas, United States, served by Amtraks Southwest Chief train. It is the nearest station to Kansas' largest city, Wichita.

History 

The station was originally built in a Tudor Revival style by Atchison, Topeka and Santa Fe Railway in 1929, and was modeled after William Shakespeare's house in Stratford-on-Avon. Newton station was added to the National Register of Historic Places in 1985. From 2015 to 2019 the station has consistently been the most-frequented Amtrak station in Kansas.

Local colleges 

 Bethel College, north  in North Newton
 Hesston College, northwest  in Hesston
 Tabor College, northeast  in Hillsboro
 Wichita State University, south  in Wichita

See also 

 La Junta Subdivision, branch of the BNSF Railway
 List of Amtrak stations

Gallery

References

External links 

 Newton Amtrak Station (USA Rail Guide -- Train Web)
 1930 station history, specialcollections.wichita.edu

Amtrak stations in Kansas
Atchison, Topeka and Santa Fe Railway stations
Buildings and structures in Harvey County, Kansas
National Register of Historic Places in Harvey County, Kansas
Railway stations on the National Register of Historic Places in Kansas
Railway stations in the United States opened in 1929